Fractional executives  are professionals who offer their management services to organizations on a for-hire, part-time basis. These executives typically have extensive experience in a business environment in roles such as chairperson, owner, CxO, senior vice president, vice president, or director. Their skills can be focused in one discipline or be more broad-based, depending on their experience.

Overview
Fractional executives may work as independent consultants or as part of a consulting firm. However, they are not consultants in the classical sense, because they take an active leadership or management role in the company that hires them, implementing changes and leading the organization just as their permanent counterpart would. They are hired on a project basis, a time-limited basis, or in some cases, on retainer, but they do not work full-time for any particular organization.

They may also be known as an interim executive, contract executive, part-time executive, temporary executive, fractional business executive, on-demand executive or executive-as-a-service.

The advantages of hiring such professionals is their experience and that they do not require a full-time position. While fractional executives are highly skilled within their area(s) of expertise, they may require time to get acclimated to new industries.

Fractional management is in the end a particular declination of interim and temporary management originated by the demand coming from small entrepreneurial companies (less than US$10 million), for which a classical temporary manager may be redundant.

Specific definition and application cases have been discussed in a congress organized by the Italian HR Directors Association (AIDP) and the Italian Chief Financial Officers Association (ANDAF).

A couple of examples of specifically named Fractional Executives are Fractional CIO, Fractional CMO, Fractional CEO, Fractional Sales Manager, VP of Sales, or CSO, Fractional CFO.

The concept has gained increasing popularity as companies seek to optimize their use of resources and bring in highly skilled leaders as needed.

One notable example of the success of the fractional executive model is A-team, a fractional executive platform. In 2022, A-team announced that it had raised $60 million in funding from a group of investors led by Tiger Global and including Jay-Z's Marcy Venture Partners, indicating that the fractional executive model is gaining recognition as a legitimate and valuable approach to business leadership.  Other Marketplaces in the Fractional Executive space include Shiny and Continuum which raised US$12M in funding.

Furthermore, an emerging global community of fractional executives has developed, with communities like The Fractional Executive providing resources and networking opportunities for fractional executives from around the world. These communities also offer access to job listings, industry events, and educational opportunities.

The fractional executive model is expected to continue growing in popularity as companies seek to optimize their resources and bring in specialized expertise on a flexible basis. With the support of major investors and the emergence of global communities, fractional executives are set to play an increasingly important role in the business world in the years to come.

References

Management occupations